Kristian Lipovac (born 3 December 1989) is a Slovenian footballer who is a goalkeeper.

Lipovac played his first match for Olimpija on 25 July 2010 against Gorica.

References

1989 births
Living people
Footballers from Ljubljana
Slovenian footballers
Slovenian PrvaLiga players
NK Aluminij players
NK Olimpija Ljubljana (2005) players
Association football goalkeepers